HAV or hav may refer to:
 Hallux abducto valgus, or bunion
 Hand arm vibrations
 Hardware-assisted virtualization
 Havant railway station, in England
 Havant RFC, an English rugby union club
 Haversine function
 Havildar, a rank in the Indian and Pakistani armies
 Havre (Amtrak station), in Montana, United States  
 Havu language, spoken in the Democratic Republic of the Congo
 Hepatitis A virus
 Highly Automated Vehicle, a term for Autonomous car but also includes vehicles with Advanced driver-assistance systems features
 Hindu Aikya Vedi, a Hindu organization
 Hybrid Air Vehicles, a British manufacturer
 José Martí International Airport in Havana, Cuba
 Lifting stone, called hav in the Faroe Islands
 Hav, a fictional location in the novel Last Letters from Hav by Jan Morris
 Hav., the author abbreviation for Norwegian botanist Johan Havaas

See also 
 Have (disambiguation)